Women’s singles badminton event at the 1996 Summer Olympics was held from 24 July to 1 August 1996. The tournament was single-elimination. Matches consisted of three sets. The tournament was held at the Georgia State University Gymnasium.

Seeds
  (quarterfinals)
  (bronze medalist)
  (quarterfinals)
  (gold medalist)
  (silver medalist)
  (quarterfinals)
  (fourth place)
  (quarterfinals)

Draw

Finals

Section 1

Section 2

Section 3

Section 4

References

Sources

Badminton at the 1996 Summer Olympics
Olymp
Women's events at the 1996 Summer Olympics